LeChuck is a fictional character in LucasArts' Monkey Island series of graphic adventure games. Created by Ron Gilbert, LeChuck was introduced in The Secret of Monkey Island and is the main antagonist of the series. Gilbert drew on aspects of the characters in the 1988 novel On Stranger Tides for his concept for LeChuck.

An undead pirate captain, LeChuck is obsessed with pursuing the affections of the series' heroine, Elaine Marley, and exacting revenge upon protagonist Guybrush Threepwood, who is responsible for consistently thwarting his plans; at some points, he is depicted as being Guybrush's brother. LeChuck is not limited to one incarnation and has been depicted variously as a ghost, a zombie, and a demon, among other forms. While sometimes gullible and naïve, LeChuck is a powerful and intelligent villain, making extensive use of voodoo magic in his megalomaniacal plans.

The character of LeChuck was very well received by video game critics, and has appeared on numerous lists of the top video game villains of all time.

Character design
LeChuck was created by Ron Gilbert. Gilbert's concept for LeChuck, especially the character's heavy use of voodoo magic, was influenced by the characters in the 1988 novel On Stranger Tides. The "Chuck" portion of the character's name comes from Lucasfilm general manager Steve Arnold, who told Gilbert that he really liked the name Chuck and would like to see it appear in more games.

While the first two games in the series did not feature voice acting, actor Earl Boen provided LeChuck's voice for both The Curse of Monkey Island and Escape from Monkey Island, reprising the role for the later Special Editions of the first two games. Boen was initially absent from Telltale Games' Tales of Monkey Island; LeChuck was instead voiced by Adam Harrington in the first chapter, with Kevin Blackton voicing the human version of the character in the subsequent chapters. Boen returned to the role for the final two chapters, in which LeChuck is restored to his undead form; Boen has since recorded Harrington's lines for the first chapter for the DVD release of the game. Boen retired from voice acting in 2017 and when approached by Gilbert to voice LeChuck again in Return to Monkey Island ultimately decided he was too old and instead gave his approval to replace him, with Jess Harnell taking over the role.

Gilbert has drawn parallels between LeChuck and the character of Davy Jones in the later Pirates of the Caribbean film series, implying that LeChuck may have served as an inspiration for the character's attitude, tone and design. Regarding Jones' appearance, Gilbert wrote: "If I'd thought of the squid tentacles for a beard, I would have done that".

Attributes
Though intelligent, LeChuck displays a ruthless and sadistic disposition, with little regard for human life. Throughout the series he is driven by a megalomaniacal desire for power and by his love of the series' lead female character, Elaine Marley. LeChuck frequently attempts to make Elaine his undead bride, regardless of Elaine's own views on the matter. Following his defeat in the first game of the series, LeChuck fosters a deep hatred towards protagonist Guybrush Threepwood, whom he recognises as a real threat to his plans due to Threepwood's resourcefulness. By Escape from Monkey Island LeChuck regrets having missed the opportunity to simply kill Guybrush in the past, having preferred the opportunity to gloat in victory over eliminating his enemy. Despite his intellect, LeChuck is arrogant and overconfident, and can be gullible, which often leads to his downfall.

Following his transformation into a human in Tales of Monkey Island, LeChuck's nature appears to change. Wielding a kinder and more friendly disposition, he is willing to go over great distances to repair the damage caused by his own actions. His feelings about his past as an undead pirate are mixed, shown to be regretful about his malicious deeds, but longing for the powers he lost, feeling weaker and less bright than he used to be. His relationship with both Guybrush and Elaine changes, respecting their marriage despite his love for Elaine and admiring the innate ability at puzzle-solving of his former nemesis. However, by the end of the game, it becomes apparent that this new behavior is nothing more than an act put on by LeChuck using a voodoo belt buckle to become more trustworthy to orchestrate his latest scheme for power and Elaine's hand in marriage. He is very fond of voodoo magic and artifacts, and constantly uses them in his plans, although he is just as often defeated by voodoo means.

Despite the fact that he is undead, LeChuck resembles a stereotypical pirate captain, complete with a full beard, large captain hat with feather, sword, and common pirate phrases. His original, living form was not shown until Tales of Monkey Island, after Guybrush inadvertently restored his humanity. After attaining his demon-pirate form in The Curse of Monkey Island, however, he loses many of his human features in exchange for a beard of flames, fiery eyes, pyrokinetic capabilities, and a less humanoid face. All three of his normal "undead" appearances are seen in Escape from Monkey Island, as he has gained the ability to swap between these forms, and near the end of the game, he possesses a large statue of himself that Guybrush must defeat in Monkey Kombat.

Appearances
LeChuck is introduced in The Secret of Monkey Island as a ghost pirate captain of a ship of undead pirates. Prior to the events of the game, LeChuck had been in a brief but unsuccessful relationship with Elaine Marley, the governor of Mêlée Island. After Elaine spurns his advances, LeChuck makes an effort to impress the governor by sailing off in pursuit of the secret of Monkey Island. The exhibition ultimately costs LeChuck his life, but he returns as a ghost and begins to terrorise the Caribbean, operating out of Monkey Island. Having scared most of the pirates in the Caribbean into staying in port, LeChuck begins to plan kidnapping Elaine and forcing her to marry him. Upon learning of Guybrush Threepwood, a new pirate-in-training on Mêlée Island who could cause problems to his plan, LeChuck travels to Mêlée Island to personally dispose of Guybrush, disguising himself as the island's sheriff. LeChuck confronts Guybrush, ties him to a weight and pushes him into the harbour waters. Leaving Guybrush for dead, LeChuck and his crew raid the island and kidnap Elaine, taking her to their Monkey Island hideout. Guybrush survives, however, and having become smitten by the governor himself, mounts a rescue mission to Monkey Island. Guybrush is unable to reach Elaine in time, as LeChuck's ship returns to Mêlée Island for the wedding. Nevertheless, Guybrush gatecrashes the wedding, intent on killing LeChuck using an anti-ghost potion based on a voodoo root, only to find that Elaine had the same plan in mind. Infuriated, LeChuck attacks Guybrush, but his spirit form is destroyed when he is sprayed with root beer.

In Monkey Island 2: LeChuck's Revenge, Guybrush makes the mistake of showing the still-living beard of LeChuck's ghost form to LeChuck's former first mate, Largo LaGrande, on Scabb Island. LaGrande takes the beard and uses it to reanimate LeChuck's corpse. Rather than pursue Elaine directly, LeChuck turns his focus to hunting down and exacting vengeance on Guybrush first, to eliminate the competition. LeChuck tasks LaGrande with capturing Guybrush, who is searching for the fabled treasure of Big Whoop, and bringing him to LeChuck's secret fortress. LeChuck even goes as far as putting a bounty on Guybrush, spurring others in the Tri-Island Area to pursue Threepwood, most notably on Phatt Island. Eventually, Guybrush is lured to the fortress when LaGrande takes one of his friends, local cartographer Wally B. Feed, hostage. Having captured Guybrush, LeChuck constructs an elaborate Rube Goldberg-esque mechanism to lower his nemesis into an acid pit, planning to turn Threepwood's remains, which LeChuck explains will be "still alive, and in great pain", into a chair. Guybrush manages to escape and accidentally detonates the gunpowder magazine, destroying the fortress and flinging him to Dinky Island, the location of Big Whoop. LeChuck catches up to Guybrush in a tunnel system beneath the island who reveals that he is Guybrush's brother, and tortures him using a voodoo doll. However, Guybrush constructs an impromptu voodoo doll of his own, using it to tear off LeChuck's leg. The incapacitated LeChuck then tells Guybrush to take off his mask so he can see the true face of his brother. Reluctantly Threewood takes off LeChuck's mask revealing his long lost brother Chuckie, and the two pirates then emerge on the surface to find they are in the modern day Big Whoop amusement park where the two are now children about to be picked up by their parents. As the game ends, Chuckie looks at the camera and opens his mouth wickedly, his eyes glowing red with evil magic.

In The Curse of Monkey Island, with Guybrush fooled into thinking he is a child, LeChuck returns his attention to pursuing Elaine's love, bombarding her coastal fortification on Plunder Island. Meanwhile, Guybrush has somehow managed to escape from LeChuck's curse and inadvertently sails into the middle of the battle, only to be captured and imprisoned on LeChuck's ship. Guybrush's antics below decks results in the ship being scuttled; the shaking of the ship causes LeChuck to drop a volatile voodoo cannonball intended to kill Elaine. The cannonball's explosion destroys LeChuck's zombie form, though LeChuck is reincarnated soon after as a demon and returns to Monkey Island to rebuild his forces. Once set, he sends them out find Elaine and Guybrush, displaying a willingness to burn every island in the Caribbean if necessary. The two are eventually captured on Blood Island. On Monkey Island, LeChuck explains to his captives that Big Whoop is not a physical treasure, but rather a powerful portal into Hell itself: during his quest for the secret of Monkey Island, LeChuck harnessed the portal to give him his voodoo powers and transform himself into the living dead. To protect Big Whoop's secret, LeChuck orchestrated the deaths of Elaine's grandfather and his crew, who had been searching for Big Whoop at the same time, and built an amusement park around the Big Whoop to bolster his ranks of undead minions. LeChuck now plans to pass Elaine through the portal, turning her into his undead bride, and once again curses Guybrush into becoming a child. Both Guybrush and Elaine escape from LeChuck's grasp, reversing the curse on Guybrush; Guybrush then manages to trap LeChuck under a mountain of ice.

By the fourth game in the series, Escape from Monkey Island, LeChuck has been freed from his icy prison by Ozzie Mandrill, an Australian capitalist. LeChuck sympathises with Mandril's hatred of pirates and assists his efforts to gentrify the Caribbean through the use of a voodoo talisman, the Ultimate Insult—LeChuck wants to use the talisman on Elaine to make her his obedient wife. Due to her long absence from Mêlée Island, Elaine has been declared dead and the position of governor of the Tri-Island Area is opened for election. LeChuck assumes the guise of "Charles L. Charles" and defeats Elaine in the election: the townspeople, feeling neglected by Elaine's long absence, do not believe her efforts to convince them of Charles' true nature. Now in control of Mêlée Island, Mandrill and LeChuck acquire the Ultimate Insult and maroon Guybrush on Monkey Island. While on Monkey Island, Guybrush discovers that resident castaway Herman Toothrot is actually Elaine's presumed dead grandfather Horatio Marley; the two escape through the use of a large robot monkey and disable the apparatus needed to project the Ultimate Insult across the whole Caribbean. LeChuck loses patience and uses his voodoo powers to inhabit a giant statue of himself he has had built on the island, with the intent of using the statue to personally crush all resistance to his rise to power, but is brought to heel when Mandrill exposes him to the Ultimate Insult. Guybrush's monkey robot and LeChuck's statue engage in Monkey Kombat. Eventually, LeChuck grows exasperated and crushes Mandrill and the Ultimate Insult, the side effect of which destroys his statue.

In Tales of Monkey Island, set several years after Escape from Monkey Island, LeChuck once again kidnaps Elaine. In his rescue attempt, Guybrush inadvertently turns LeChuck into a human and releases a voodoo pox over the Gulf of Melange. Elaine and a now seemingly unmalicious LeChuck begin returning monkeys used in LeChuck's voodoo experiments to their homes while Guybrush searches for La Esponja Grande, an artifact that will cure the pox. LeChuck eventually begins to befriend Elaine and Guybrush, coming to his defence when Threepwood is put on trial for various crimes on Flotsam Island, and accuses the Voodoo Lady, an enigmatic advisor of Guybrush through the series, of contriving all of his and Guybrush's confrontations over the years. Unknown to the others, LeChuck is actually placing the voodoo-empowered monkeys in strategic places around the Gulf; when Guybrush cures the pox, LeChuck turns on Threepwood and kills him after having killed bounty hunter Morgan LeFlay; LeChuck then uses La Esponja Grande to transfer the voodoo pox's potency to himself. Aided by Guybrush's passing and the monkeys, LeChuck opens a gateway to the crossroads of the afterlife, drawing on the unlimited source of power to rise as a pirate god. Guybrush, who manages to reunite his spirit and body, lures and traps LeChuck in a rift between the real world and the crossroads, where he is stabbed simultaneously by Elaine and the spirit of Morgan, destroying both his physical and spiritual forms. At the conclusion of the game, his voodoo essence is taken by Morgan and given to the Voodoo Lady in exchange for Morgan's return to the physical realm.

Reception
The character was very well received. IGN described him alongside Guybrush and Elaine as one of "the most beloved adventure characters of all time". Electronic Gaming Monthly ranked LeChuck eighth on a 2008 list of top ten "badass" undead, stating that LeChuck is "a not entirely brilliant villain who usually clues you in to his weakness (hint: it's always voodoo), LeChuck's versatility makes up for what he lacks in common sense; he shows up as an evil ghost pirate, and an evil undead-demon-zombie-ghost pirate. That covers the undead-pirate spectrum". ScrewAttack placed LeChuck at number 9 in top ten Ghosts in video game history, and also ranked him number one on their list of top beards in video games.

The character is considered one of top video game villains of all time. In 2010, IGN listed LeChuck as the 24th best game villain, and also praised his adaptability, having been a ghost, zombie, demon, and a human. While GamesRadar put this "one scary demon/zombie/ghost pirate" in their list of the best villains in video game history at number nine, WhatCulture! ranked him 48th on its list of the greatest video game villains of all time. On the list of the "coolest" video game villains by Complex in 2012, LeChuck placed tenth. He was also listed as the eighth best character in PC gaming history in 2008 by PC Zone. It commented: "Guybrush Threepwood and Stan the Used Ship Salesman were stars, but it was the evil Pirate LeChuck who became the poster boy/ghost/zombie/demon of the Monkey Island series".

Notes

References

Demon characters in video games
Fictional governors
Fictional impostors
Fictional sheriffs
Fictional sea captains
Fictional swordfighters in video games
Fictional mass murderers
Fictional necromancers
Fictional pirates in video games
Fictional torturers
Ghost characters in video games
Male characters in video games
Monkey Island characters
Shapeshifter characters in video games
Video game bosses
Video game characters introduced in 1990
Video game characters who use magic
Zombie and revenant characters in video games